Kalvakuntla is an Indian surname. Notable people with the surname include:

Kalvakuntla Chandrashekhar Rao (born 1954), Indian politician
K. Kavitha (born Kalvakuntla Kavitha in 1978), Indian politician
K. T. Rama Rao (born Kalvakuntla Taraka Rama Rao in 1976), Indian politician

Surnames of Indian origin